Giovanni Nicotera (9 September 1828 – 13 June 1894) was an Italian patriot and politician. His surname is pronounced , with the stress on the second syllable.

Biography
Nicotera was born at Sambiase, in Calabria, in the Kingdom of the Two Sicilies.

Joining the Giuseppe Mazzini's movement of Giovine Italia ("Young Italy") he was among the combatants at Naples in May 1848, and battle with Garibaldi during the Republic of Rome (1849). After the fall of Rome he fled to Piedmont. In 1857, he took part to the expedition to Sapri, led by Pisacane, but shortly after their landing they were defeated and he was severely wounded by the Bourbon troops.

Condemned to death, but reprieved through the intervention of the British minister, he remained a prisoner at Naples and at Favignana until 1860, when he joined Garibaldi at Palermo. Sent by Garibaldi to Tuscany, he attempted to invade the Papal States with a volunteer brigade, but his followers were disarmed and disbanded by Ricasoli and Cavour. In 1862 he was with Garibaldi at Aspromonte; in 1866 he commanded a volunteer brigade against Austria; in 1867 he invaded the Papal States from the south, but the defeat of Garibaldi at Mentana put an end to his enterprise.

His parliamentary career dates from 1860. During the first ten years he engaged in violent opposition, but from 1870 onwards he joined in supporting the military reforms of Ricotti. Upon the advent of the Left in 1876, Nicotera became minister of the interior, and governed with remarkable firmness. He was obliged to resign in December 1877, when he joined Crispi, Cairoli, Zanardelli and Baccarini in forming the "pentarchy" in opposition to Depretis, but he only returned to power thirteen years later as minister of the interior in the Rudinì cabinet of 1891. On this occasion he restored the system of uninominal constituencies, resisted the socialist agitation, and pressed, though in vain, for the adoption of drastic measures against the false bank-notes put in circulation by the Banca Romana. He fell with the Rudini cabinet in May 1892, and died at Vico Equense, near Naples, in June 1894.

Ships
Giovanni Nicotera was the name of a destroyer of the Italian Regia Marina, launched in 1926 and decommissioned in 1940.

References

1828 births
1894 deaths
People from Lamezia Terme
Kingdom of the Two Sicilies people
Historical Left politicians
Dissident Left politicians
Italian Ministers of the Interior
Deputies of Legislature VIII of the Kingdom of Italy
Deputies of Legislature IX of the Kingdom of Italy
Deputies of Legislature X of the Kingdom of Italy
Deputies of Legislature XI of the Kingdom of Italy
Deputies of Legislature XII of the Kingdom of Italy
Deputies of Legislature XIII of the Kingdom of Italy
Deputies of Legislature XIV of the Kingdom of Italy
Deputies of Legislature XV of the Kingdom of Italy
Deputies of Legislature XVI of the Kingdom of Italy
Deputies of Legislature XVII of the Kingdom of Italy
Deputies of Legislature XVIII of the Kingdom of Italy
Politicians of Calabria
Italian people of the Italian unification